Kris Kamm (born November 29, 1964) is an American actor, most recognizable from his role as Stuart Rosebrock in the sitcom Coach.

Kamm was born in Evanston, Illinois. His first acting roles were small parts on television shows. He has appeared on such television series as Murder, She Wrote; Married... with Children; and 21 Jump Street. His most famous work was as Stuart Rosebrock on Coach. He left the show to pursue other acting interests but returned for the final episode. After Coach, Kamm continued to work in small roles in television. He appeared in such films as The Heroes of Desert Storm, When the Party's Over and Wyatt Earp.

Filmography

References

1964 births
Living people
American male film actors
American male television actors
Male actors from Illinois
People from Evanston, Illinois